The Eastern Ore Mountains form a natural region of Saxony that covers the eastern part (in area almost the eastern half) of the Saxon Ore Mountains range. Together with the Western and Central Ore Mountains, it is part of the larger Saxon Highlands and Uplands region. Its southern continuation beyond the German border covers an area of roughly the same extent in the Czech Republic.

Geography
The region is bounded in the west by the valley of the Flöha river, itself part of the Central Ore Mountains region. In the northeast it borders on Saxon Switzerland, the German (northern) side of the Elbe Sandstone Mountains, at Bad Gottleuba. The boundary with the Ore Mountain Foreland to the north is rather unclear, roughly running from the town of Flöha along the Tharandt Forest to Tharandt. In the south, the crest of the mountain range closely follows the state border with the Czech Republic.

The highest peak on the Czech side is the Loučná (Wieselstein, at ). 

The upper regions of the Eastern Ore Mountains in the district of Mittelsachsen are part of the Ore Mountains/Vogtland Nature Park. The region includes the prominent Geisingberg peak as well as the Georgenfelder Hochmoor protected area.

Settlements

Rivers and lakes

Nature reserves 

The upper areas of the Eastern Ore Mountains are part of the Ore Mountains/Vogtland Nature Park and include the following nature reserves:
 Black Grouse reserve of Fürstenau
 Fürstenau Heath nature reserve
 Protected mountain meadows in the Eastern Ore Mountains - a major conservation area with its own unique linear cairns
 Geisingberg nature reserve
 Georgenfelder Hochmoor

Culture and sights 
The Eastern Ore Mountains are also called the Crabapple Mountains due to the large numbers of wild apple and crabapple trees.

 Kohlhaukuppe
 The "Cross-border Mining Trail" project from Krupka via Geising, Altenberg and Zinnwald to Cinovec-Dubi.

See also 
 List of mountains in the Ore Mountains
 List of mountains in Saxony
 List of regions of Saxony

References

General sources 
 Federal Agency for Nature Conservation (BfN)
 Map services
 Landscape fact files:
 Upper regions of the Eastern Ore Mountains
 Lower regions of the Eastern Ore Mountains
 Tharandt Forest (in the north of the Eastern Ore Mountains)

Literature 
 Peter Rölke (Hrsg.): Wander- & Naturführer Osterzgebirge, Berg- & Naturverlag Rölke,  Dresden 2007, 
 Grüne Liga Osterzgebirge: Naturführer Ost-Erzgebirge. Band 1: Tiere und Pflanzen des Ost-Erzgebirges. Sandstein Verlag, Dresden 2007,  (enthält über 750 Artenbeschreibungen) Digitalisat (pdf-Dateien der einzelnen Kapitel)
 Grüne Liga Osterzgebirge: Naturführer Ost-Erzgebirge. Band 2: Natur des Ost-Erzgebirges im Überblick. Sandstein Verlag, Dresden 2007,  (umfangreiche Darstellung zu Klima, Geologie, Kulturlandschaftsentwicklung) Digitalisat (pdf-Dateien der einzelnen Kapitel)
 Grüne Liga Osterzgebirge: Naturführer Ost-Erzgebirge. Band 3: Naturkundliche Wanderziele. Sandstein Verlag, Dresden 2007,  (detaillierte Darstellung von 26 Teilgebieten des Naturraumes) Digitalisat (pdf-Datei, 14.7 MB)
 Erhard Unger: Die Klimaverhältnisse des östlichen Erzgebirges. in: Sächsische Heimatblätter, Heft 6/1975, S. 287-290

External links 
 http://www.osterzgebirge.net
Nature guide for the Eastern Ore Mountains

Central Uplands
Geography of the Ore Mountains
Natural regions of Saxony
Mountain ranges of Saxony